Communauté urbaine (French for "urban community") is the second most integrated form of intercommunality in France, after the Metropolis. A communauté urbaine is composed of a city (commune) and its independent suburbs (independent communes).

The first communautés urbaines were created by the French Parliament on 31 December 1966. Originally there were only four, found in the metropolitan areas of Bordeaux, Lille, Lyon and Strasbourg. Later, others were created in other metropolitan areas. The purpose of the communautés urbaines was to achieve cooperation and joint administration between large cities and their independent suburbs. This step often followed failed attempts to merge the communes within a metropolitan area. The status of the communauté urbaine was modified by the Chevènement Law of 1999. Since the creation of the métropoles in 2011, several former communautés urbaines have become métropoles, for instance Nice, Strasbourg, Marseille, Nancy and Dijon.

Unlike the case in either a communauté d'agglomération or communauté de communes, communes cannot leave a communauté urbaine freely.

As of April 2018, there are 11 communautés urbaines in France (all in metropolitan France), with a combined population of 2.43 million inhabitants (as of 2015, in 2018 limits). All of the urban areas in France with more than half a million inhabitants are a communauté urbaine or a métropole. Some communautés urbaines are relatively small; smaller than many communautés d'agglomération.

The communautés urbaines are each administrated by a council called a "conseil communautaire" (community council), composed of a proportional representation of members of municipal councils of member towns. The council is headed by an executive composed of a president and vice-presidents elected by the council. The president is in many cases the mayor of the main or most populous city. The mayors of the others cities are often also vice-presidents of the executive, the deputies-mayors are often members of the council, as are some members of the towns' councils.

List of communautés urbaines

References 

 
Fifth-level administrative divisions by country